The Ampex Golden Reel Award was an international music award for studio albums and singles that were recorded and mixed entirely on Ampex audio tape, and which subsequently sold enough units to achieve gold record status in its country of origin. In the United States, gold record status requires sales of 500,000 units, as verified by the Recording Industry Association of America.

When an album or single won the award, one Golden Reel commemorative plaque was given to the musical group/artist, and another to the recording studio. Ampex also made a donation to a charity chosen by the group or artist who received the award. They presented the first Golden Reel in 1977, and the 500th in 1986. During that period, the amount of each donation was US$1,000. When the 1977 film soundtrack Saturday Night Fever won the Bee Gees their third Golden Reel Award, the band chose to give the money to the Bertha Abbess Children's Center. When Ampex awarded the 250th Golden Reel to US rock band Journey for their 1981 album Escape, the band's chosen charity was the T. J. Martell Leukemia Foundation. The 500th musical act to receive the award was Kool & the Gang, for their 1984 album Emergency.

Some other award recipients from the United States were Crystal Gayle, Atlanta Rhythm Section, Evelyn "Champagne" King, Roberta Flack, Maze, Con Funk Shun, Instant Funk, The Isley Brothers, Kansas, Grover Washington Jr., Donna Summer, and Midnight Star. A few of the recipients from other countries were Pink Lady in Japan, Supertramp in the UK, Barbadian Artist Charles D. Lewis in Germany and Mango Groove in South Africa.

Only one gospel music album ever qualified for the award: Cristy Lane's One Day at a Time (1981). Sales of the album had surged in 1986, owing to a telemarketing campaign orchestrated by her husband.

See also
 Billboard Music Award
 List of best-selling albums
 List of best-selling albums by country
 Music industry

References

Awards established in 1977
International music awards